Nefertiti, the Beautiful One Has Come is an album by the Cecil Taylor Unit, recorded live at the Café Montmartre in Copenhagen, Denmark on November 23, 1962. This concert is nearly all he recorded from 1962 to 1966.

Background
In 1962, Taylor went to Europe with alto saxophonist Jimmy Lyons and drummer Sunny Murray. (Bassist Henry Grimes was supposed to join them, but fell ill at the last moment.) During that time, the group made a stylistic breakthrough; Murray stated: "We were in Sweden and we had finally decided to be free... The way Cecil and Jimmy and I were playing, we could absorb any different thing at that period, because we were so fresh!" The music on Nefertiti documents that period.

Part of the concert was released on the album Live at the Café Montmartre with more following on Nefertiti, the Beautiful One Has Come. Material was also issued as Trance (Black Lion), Innovations, and What's New. The complete Café Montmartre recordings were released by Revenant in 1997. The one extant recording of Albert Ayler performing with Taylor's group at Café Montmartre was released in 2004 on  Holy Ghost, Revenant's nine-disc box set of Ayler's recordings.

Reception
The recording has been praised as "a landmark performance." David Borgo has written that it "marks... the unalterable trajectory of Taylor's music to move without standard song forms and uniform rhythmic pulse." According to the authors of The Penguin Guide to Jazz Recordings, the album "...should be accounted among the greatest live recordings in jazz. Taylor is still working his way out of jazz tradition and, with Murray at his heels, the playing has an irresistible momentum that creates its own kind of rocking swing, the pulse indefinable but palpable, the rhythm moving in waves from the drummer's kit. Lyons shapes his bebopper's vocabulary into gritty flurries of notes, a man caught in a squall and fighting his way through it and over it... Here he is sharing in the discovery of a fierce new world."

Regarding the title track, Shaun Brady wrote: "Murray begins with stuttering accents that grow increasingly clamorous and eventually cohere into a tsunami of sheer momentum, lifting, propelling and unsettling Taylor and saxophonist Jimmy Lyons. At one moment he batters them forward with monolithic force, the next slamming on the brakes, leaving them suspended in mid-air."

Track listing 
All compositions by Cecil Taylor except where noted.
 "Trance"  – 9:12
 "Call"  – 9:00
 "Lena"  – 6:58
 "D Trad, That's What"  – 21:26
 "Call [Second Version]"  – 6:37
 "What's New?" (Johnny Burke, Bob Haggart) – 12:11
 "Nefertiti, the Beautiful One Has Come"  – 9:11
 "Lena [Second Version]"  – 14:21
 "Nefertiti, the Beautiful One Has Come [Second Version]"  – 8:07
 "D Trad, That's What [Second Version]"  – 20:08

1-4 first issued on Live at the Café Montmartre (1963) 
6-9 first issued on Nefertiti, the Beautiful One Has Come (1965) 
1-4 and 6-9 first collected on Nefertiti, the Beautiful One Has Come (1976) 
5 first issued on Trance (1996) 
10 first issued on the Revenant issue of Nefertiti, the Beautiful One Has Come (1997), along with two "silent tracks" preceding the bonus material

Personnel 
 Cecil Taylor – piano
 Jimmy Lyons – alto saxophone
 Sunny Murray – drums

References 

1962 live albums
Albums recorded at Jazzhus Montmartre
Black Lion Records live albums
Cecil Taylor live albums
Debut Records live albums
Freedom Records live albums